Tony Browne (born 1 July 1973) is an Irish hurler who played as a right wing-back for the Waterford senior team from 1991 until his retirement from inter-county hurling in 2014.

Browne made his first appearance for the team during the 1991–92 National League and immediately became a regular member of the starting fifteen. During his inter-county career, he won four Munster winners' medals and one National League winners' medal.  He ended up as an All-Ireland runner-up on one occasion.

At club level Browne is a one-time Munster medalist with Mount Sion. In addition to this he has won seven county club championship medals.

Browne has a number of personal achievements, including being the most "capped" Waterford hurler of all-time. He won three All-Star awards and, in 1998, he became the first Waterford player to be named All-Star Hurler of the Year. In 2009 he was chosen on the Munster team of the past twenty-five years.

Playing career

Club

Browne plays his club hurling with Mount Sion and had several successes in a lengthy career.

After claiming championship medals in the minor and under-21 grades, he later became a key member of the Mount Sion senior hurling team. Browne won his first championship medal in this grade in 1994 following a 2–13 to 1–11 defeat of Passage.

After surrendering their title the following year, it was 1998 before Mount Sion reached the championship decider once again. Ballyduff Upper were the opponents on that occasion, however, a 3–19 to 0–10 thrashing gave Browne his second championship medal.

Mount Sion failed to retain the title once again, however, Browne lined out in a third successive decider in 2000. A 1–20 to 0–9 trouncing of Ballygunner gave Browne a third championship medal.

Both Mount Sion and Ballygunner lined out in the county final once again in 2002. A 1–19 to 2–14 victory gave Browne his fourth championship medal. Mount Sion subsequently reached the provincial decider where Sixmilebridge provided the opposition. A narrow 0–12 to 0–10 defeat gave Browne a Munster medal.

Mount Sion retained their county championship for the first time in almost thirty years in 2003. A 1–14 to 1–10 defeat of Ballygunner gave Browne a fifth championship medal.

In 2004 Browne won his sixth championship medal as Mount Sion pulled off a hat-trick of county final victories. The 4–14 to 4–7 defeat of Ballygunner gave Mount Sion their first three-in-a-row since 1965.

Four-in-a-row proved beyond Mount Sion, however, the team qualified for the county decider once again in 2006. Ballygunner were the opponents again, however, a 2–13 to 0–12 victory gave Browne a seventh championship medal.

Minor and under-21

Browne first came to prominence with Waterford as a member of the county minor team in the late 1980s. He later joined the Waterford under-21 hurling team. In 1992, Browne was captain of the Waterford under-21 hurlers as the team reached the provincial decider. A narrow 0–17 to 1–12 defeat of Clare gave him his first Munster medal. He later led his team to Croke Park for an All-Ireland final showdown with Offaly. A 4–4 to 0–16 draw was the result on that occasion, however, Waterford were more effective in the replay. A 0–12 to 2–3 victory gave Browne an All-Ireland Under-21 Hurling Championship medal while he also had the honour of collecting the cup on behalf of the team.

Two years later in 1994 Browne won a second Munster medal in the under-21 grade.

Senior

By this stage Browne was already a member of the Waterford senior hurling team. He made his debut against Galway in a National League game in 1991 and became a regular member of the starting fifteen.

After a number of years in the doldrums of provincial hurling, Waterford qualified for the Munster final in 1998 with Browne lining out at centre field.  Waterford held All-Ireland champions Clare to a draw in the decider, however, Waterford lost the replay.  Browne's side later faced Kilkenny in the All-Ireland semi-final in what would be the county's first appearance in Croke Park since 1963. Kilkenny won by a single point. Browne finished the season by collecting Waterford's first All-Star in sixteen years while he was also named Eircell Hurler of the Year.

Four years later in 2002, Waterford reached the Munster final once again and defeated Tipperary by 2–23 to 3–12 to their first provincial crown in thirty-nine years. It was Browne's first Munster medal. Waterford's hurling odyssey came to an end in the All-Ireland semi-final.

After surrendering the Munster title to Cork in 2003, Browne's side were back in the provincial final for a third successive year in 2004. In one of the greatest games of all-time, Waterford defeated Cork in a Munster final for the first time in forty-five years to take the title by 3–16 to 1–21. In spite of collecting his second Munster medal, an All-Ireland appearance eluded the team yet again.

The following few years proved difficult for Browne.  Waterford crashed out of the early stages of the provincial championship in 2005 and 2006.  On both these occasions his team was defeated by Cork in the All-Ireland series. There were also rumours at this time that Browne was quitting inter-county hurling as he was planning to emigrate.

In 2007, Browne added a National Hurling League medal to his collection when Waterford defeated Kilkenny by 0–20 to 0–18 in the final. He later claimed a third Munster medal as Waterford defeated Limerick by 3–17 to 1–14 in the provincial decider. While Waterford were viewed as possibly going on and winning the All-Ireland title for the first time in almost half a century, Limerick ambushed Waterford in the All-Ireland semi-final. In spite of a disappointing end to the season, Browne collected a third All-Star award.

2008 began poorly for Waterford as the team lost their opening game to Clare as well as their manager Justin McCarthy. In spite of this poor start, Browne's side reached the All-Ireland final for the first time in forty-five years. Kilkenny provided the opposition and went on to trounce Waterford by 3–30 to 1–13 to claim a third All-Ireland title in-a-row.

Browne lined out in another Munster final in 2010 with Cork providing the opposition. A 2–15 apiece draw was the result on that occasion, with Browne scoring the equalising goal for Waterford in the final minute. Waterford went on to win the replay after an extra-time goal by Dan Shanahan. It was a fourth Munster medal for Browne, a record that he shares with five other Waterford players.

Browne's last game for Waterford came at the age of 40, in the 2013 All-Ireland Senior Hurling Championship against Kilkenny on 13 July when he came on as a substitute.
He announced his retirement in April 2014, saying "To do so is always a tough decision for any athlete but I know I have been blessed in so many ways to have experienced what I have with the Waterford hurling teams over the past three decades".

Inter-provincial

Browne has also lined out for Munster in the inter-provincial series of games. After joining the panel as an unused substitute in 1994, he lined out on the starting fifteen a year later. A narrow 0–13 to 1–9 defeat of Ulster gave him his first Railway Cup medal.

This won was the first part of a famous three-in-a-row for Munster. Defeats of Leinster in 1996 and 1997 gave Browne two further Railway Cup medals.  Four in-a-row proved beyond Munster the following year.

In 2004 Browne returned to the Munster team after a five-year absence. It was an unsuccessful campaign for the southerners, however, three years later Browne won his fourth Railway Cup medal following a 2–22 to 2–19 defeat of Connacht.

Team
Mount Sion
Munster Senior Club Hurling Championship (1): 2002
Waterford Senior Club Hurling Championship (7): 1994, 1998, 2000, 2002, 2003, 2004, 2006

Waterford
Munster Senior Hurling Championship (4): 2002, 2004, 2007, 2010
National Hurling League (1): 2007
All-Ireland Under-21 Hurling Championship (1): 1992 (c)
Munster Under-21 Hurling Championship (2): 1992 (c), 1994

Munster
Inter-provincial Championship (4): 1995, 1996, 1997, 2007

Individual

All-Star Hurler of the Year (1): 1998
All-Stars (3): 1998, 2006, 2007

References

1973 births
Living people
Mount Sion hurlers
Waterford inter-county hurlers
Munster inter-provincial hurlers
All Stars Hurlers of the Year
Hurling selectors